The Education Commission of Hong Kong is a body established to advise the government on the overall development of education in the light of the community's needs. The body was established in 1984.

External links

Education in Hong Kong